V-League 2009 was the 53rd season of Vietnam's professional football league. The league was held from February 7, 2009 to August 23, 2009.

The league winners qualify for the AFC Champions League qualifying round in 2010. The cup winners enter the AFC Cup.

The bottom two sides at the end of the season get relegated. The side that finishes 3rd from bottom enters an end of season play-off match against the 2nd Division's 3rd placed side.

Managerial changes

Final league table

Dream Team

Play-off

References

External links
Vietnam Football Federation

Vietnamese Super League seasons
Vietnam
Vietnam
1